Public Life is the third studio album by singer Eddie Schwartz. It was released in 1984 by WEA in Canada.

Lead single "Strike" was a minor hit in Canada, reaching #47 on the RPM charts.  The second single, "Special Girl", was a top 20 hit on the Canadian Adult Contemporary charts.  "Special Girl" became much better known in the U.S. for its near-simultaneous cover by the group America, whose version became a U.S. hit in September 1984.  In the U.K., the song was a minor hit for Meat Loaf in early 1987.

Track listing
A Side

B Side

Chart performance

Singles

Personnel
Credits are adapted from the album's liner notes.
Eddie Schwartz – lead vocals, background vocals, guitar
David Tyson – keyboards, bass, glockenspiel, background vocals
Rick Derringer – guitar solos
Peter Follett – guitar solos
Gary Craig – drums
Jimmy Bralower – drums

Production team
Eddie Schwartz, David Tyson, Tony Bongiovi – producers

References

Eddie Schwartz albums
1984 albums
Warner Music Group albums